Memunda is a  small village near Vatakara town in Kozhikode district of Kerala, south India.

History
The Story of Thcholi Othenan is related to Memunda. Many exploits of Tacholi Othenan, the hero of the ballads of north malabar (Vadakkan Pattukal) were held in is the Lokanarkavu, in Memunda. Annual ceremonies are conducted in memory of "Othenan" whose birthplace is Manikoth, Meppayil near Memunda. The Lokanarkavu Bhagavathi Temple is in Memunda.

Tourism
The main attraction in Memunda is the 'Lokanarkavu Utsavam' (festival) during the months of Vrishchikam (November–December) and Meenam (March–April). The village has three rock-cut caves. The majority of the residents of Memunda are day laborers although there also reside many architects, teachers, and remote workers. There is also Kunnoth Para Quarry, a rock quarry in Memunda.

Geography 
Memunda is a small village in Kerala is located on the east coast(6 km away) of Arabian Sea at 
Memunda is surrounded by two hills- Muthappan hill and Valiya Mala.

Attractions
 Lokanarkavu(ലോകനാര് കാവ് ക്ഷേത്രം)
The Lokanarkavu in Memunda, 5 km. from Vatakara, is a popular temple of North Malabar. This temple is associated with the heroes and heroines of Vadakkanpattu. In the vicinity of the temple there are three rock-cut caves. There are candid murals and carvings adorning the caves. The main deity is Goddess Durga. The festival, locally called Pooram, is celebrated during March/April. There are two temples adjacent to the Lokanarkavu with Vishnu and Shiva as deities. Lokanarkavu goddess is named as Lokanarkavilamma which was the dearest god of Thacholi Othenan a hero of Kadathanadu.

Siddasramam:
Situated near the Payam Kuttimala, in Memunda, Siddasrama is a spiritual centre. Siddasramam has branches in Kerala as well as outside Kerala. Its one of the most popular Sidda Centre of North Malabar.

Muthappan Kavu, also known as Muthappan Mala, is in Memunda, 5 km from Vatakara town. It is a religious as well as tourist attraction. Many tourists arrive from outside of India also and every year there is a festival

Memunda Madham Naga Temple (മേമുണ്ട മഠം ക്ഷേത്രം)
It is a very ancient nagakshethram (temple dedicated to snake gods). It is situated east of Memunda town. There are many people in various religious visited in the temple. The special pooja 'Sarpa bali'is very famous.

Constituent villages of Memunda
Memunda
Keezhal
Kavil
Kuttoth
Arakulngara
Bankroad

Religious places 
 Lokanarkavu

Transportation
Memunda village connects to other parts of India through Vatakara city on the west and Kuttiady town on the east. National highway No.66 passes through Vatakara and the northern stretch connects to Mangalore, Goa and Mumbai. The southern stretch connects to Cochin and Trivandrum. The eastern Highway going through Kuttiady connects to Mananthavady, Mysore and Bangalore. The nearest airports are at Kannur and Kozhikode. The nearest railway station is at Vatakara.

See also
 Nadapuram
 Thottilpalam
 Perambra
 Madappally
 Villiappally
 Iringal
 Mahe, Pondicherry
 Muthappan Kavu
 Payyoli
 Thikkodi
 Orkkatteri

References

External links 
 Memunda on india9

Vatakara area